The 2018–19 Copa de la Reina de Fútbol was the 37th edition of the Spanish women's association football national cup.  Real Sociedad won their first title ever.

Format changes
Since this season, all the 16 teams of the Primera División would join the competition. All the rounds were played in a single-game format.

In the round of 16, the home team was designed by the luck of the draw, while in the quarterfinals, teams that have played the previous round away had preference to host the match.

On 17 January 2019, the Royal Spanish Football Federation announced that the final will be played at Los Cármenes stadium, in Granada. For the first time in the Cup history, the Spanish royal family attended the match with Queen Letizia of Spain representing it.

Schedule and format

Notes
Single-match rounds ending in a tie will be decided in extra time; and if it persists, by a penalty shootout.

Bracket

Round of 16
The round of 16 was drawn on 22 October 2018 at La Ciudad del Fútbol in Las Rozas de Madrid.

Quarter-finals
The quarter-finals were drawn on 13 December 2018 at La Ciudad del Fútbol in Las Rozas de Madrid. The match between Athletic Club and Atlético de Madrid, played at San Mamés, beat the Spanish attendance record for a women's football match at that time with 48,121 spectators.

Semi-finals
The semi-finals were drawn on 4 February 2019 at La Alhambra in Granada.

Final

Top goalscorers

References

External links
Royal Spanish Football Federation
Copa de la Reina at La Liga website

Women
Copa de la Reina
Copa de la Reina de Fútbol seasons